Menchi, in Japanese cuisine, a type of deep fry, for example Menchi katsu
 Menchi, a dog character in the manga Excel Saga
 Menchi, a character in the manga Hunter × Hunter